Ian Stanley (born 11 January 1963) is a Jamaican former cyclist. He competed in the sprint and points race events at the 1984 Summer Olympics.

References

External links
 

1963 births
Living people
Jamaican male cyclists
Olympic cyclists of Jamaica
Cyclists at the 1984 Summer Olympics
Place of birth missing (living people)